Anand Kumar (born 1 January 1973) is an Indian Mathematics educator best known for his Super 30 programme, which he started in Patna, Bihar in 2002, known for coaching underprivileged students for JEE- Main &  JEE-Advanced, the entrance examination for the Indian Institutes of Technology (IITs). By 2018, 422 out of 510 students had made it to the IITs and Discovery Channel showcased his work in a documentary. Kumar has spoken at MIT and Harvard about his programs for students from the underprivileged sections of Indian society. Kumar and his school have been the subject of several smear campaigns, some of which have been carried in Indian media sources. His life and work had been portrayed in the 2019 film, Super 30, where Kumar is played by Hrithik Roshan.

Early life

Anand Kumar was born in Bihar, India. His father was a clerk in the postal department of India. His father could not afford private schooling for his children, and Anand attended a Hindi medium government school, where he developed his deep interest in mathematics. In his childhood, he studied at Patna High School, in Patna, Bihar. During his graduation, Kumar submitted papers on number theory, which were published in the Mathematical Spectrum. Kumar secured admission to the University of Cambridge, but could not attend because of his father's death and his financial condition.

Teaching career

In 1992, Kumar began teaching mathematics. He rented a classroom for Rs. 300 per month, and began his own institute, the Ramanujan School of Mathematics (RSM). Within the span of year, his class grew from two students to thirty-six, and after three years almost 500 students had enrolled. Then in early 2000, when a poor student came to him seeking coaching for IIT-JEE, who could not afford the annual admission fee due to poverty, Kumar was motivated to start the Super 30 programme in 2002, for which he is now well-known.

Since 2002, every May, the Ramanujan School of Mathematics holds a competitive test to select 30 students for the Super 30 program. Many students appear at the test, and eventually, he takes thirty intelligent students from economically backward sections, tutors them, and provides study materials and lodging for a year. He prepares them for the Joint Entrance Examination for the Indian Institutes of Technology (IIT). His mother, Jayanti Devi, cooks for the students, and his brother Pranav Kumar takes care of the management.

During 2003 to 2017, 391 students out of 450 passed the IITs. In 2010, all the students of Super 30 cleared IIT JEE entrance making it a three in a row for the institution. Kumar has no financial support for Super 30 from any government as well as private agencies, and manages on the tuition fee he earns from the Ramanujan Institute. After the success of Super 30 and its growing popularity, he received offers from the private sector – both national and international companies – as well as the government for financial help, but he has refused it; Kumar wanted to sustain Super 30 through his own efforts.

From 2006 to 2010, 30 out of 30 students cleared the IIT-JEE.  In subsequent years, the pass rates for the 30 students at the IIT-JEE examinations were: 2011 – 24, 2012–27, 2013–28, 2014–27, 2015–25, 2016–28, 2017–30, and 2018–26.

Personal life 
In 2019, Kumar revealed that he has been suffering from Acoustic neuroma, a rare kind of brain tumor, and lost 80-90% hearing ability of his right ear due to it. He is under treatment of renowned neurosurgeon B. K. Misra at the Hinduja Hospital in Mumbai.

Recognition
In March 2009, Discovery Channel broadcast a one-hour-long programme on Super 30, and half a page was devoted to Kumar in The New York Times. Actress and former Miss Japan Norika Fujiwara visited Patna to make a documentary on Kumar's initiatives. Kumar has been featured in programmes by the BBC. He has spoken about his experiences at various global-level institutes including Indian Institute of Management Ahmedabad, a number of IITs, University of British Columbia, Tokyo University and Stanford University. He was also inducted in the Limca Book of Records (2009) for his contribution in helping poor students pass the IIT-JEE by providing them free coaching. Time magazine included Super 30 in the list of Best of Asia 2010. Kumar was awarded the S. Ramanujan Award for 2010 by the Institute for Research and Documentation in Social Sciences (IRDS) in July 2010.

Super 30 received praise from United States President Barack Obama's special envoy, Rashad Hussain, who termed it the "best" institute in the country. Newsweek Magazine has taken note of the initiative of mathematician Anand Kumar's Super 30 and included his school in the list of four most innovative schools in the world. Kumar was given the top award of Bihar government, "Maulana Abdul Kalam Azad Shiksha Puraskar", in November 2010. He was awarded the Prof. Yashwantrao Kelkar Yuva Puraskar award in 2010 by Akhil Bharatiya Vidyarthi Parishad (ABVP) in Bangalore.

In April 2011, Kumar was selected by Europe's magazine Focus as "one of the global personalities who have the ability to shape exceptionally talented people."  Kumar also helped Amitabh Bachchan in preparing for his role in the film Aarakshan. Many people from Bollywood including renowned directors and producers are interested in making a movie on the life of Anand Kumar. He was named by UK based magazine Monocle among the list of 20 pioneering teachers of the world. He was also honoured by government of British Columbia, Canada. Kumar was given the Baroda Sun Life Achievement Award by Bank of Baroda in Mumbai. Kumar was conferred with the Ramanujan Mathematics Award at the Eighth National Mathematics Convention at function in Rajkot. He was conferred with an Honorary Doctorate of Science (DSc) by Karpagam University, Coimbatore. He was also awarded Maharishi Ved Vyas by Madhya Pradesh Government for extraordinary contribution in education Anand Kumar was honored by ministry of education of Saxony of Germany.

Kumar presented his biography to then-President of India, Pranab Mukherjee, which was written by Canada-based psychiatrist Biju Mathew. Kumar was awarded "Rashtriya Bal Kalyan Award" by president of India Ram Nath Kovind. A Canadian MP Marc Dalton has praised Anand Kumar's "inspiring work" with underprivileged children as a successful model for education in Canadian parliament. Anand Kumar was conferred an honorary PhD by the National Institute of Technology.

Awards
On 8 November 2018, Anand Kumar was honoured with the Global Education Award 2018 by Malabar Gold & Diamonds in Dubai. His efforts in the field of education are considered "pioneering". Anand Kumar has been felicitated in the US with  "Education Excellence Award 2019 " by the Foundation For Excellence in Education (FFE) at a function in San Jose, California. Anand Kumar received "Mahaveer Award" in Chennai.
Anand Kumar recently awarded with Bharat Ganit Ratna Award 2022- a special award declared by DASA India - National VO operated from Agartala Tripura on 10 March 2022, which has been handed over by Anjan Banik, National Chairman of DASA India.

In 2023, he was awarded the Padma Shri by the Government of India for his contributions in the field of literature and education.

In 2018, he was awarded Bhagwan Mahaveer Award in Medicine.

In popular culture 
Bollywood director Vikas Bahl has directed a film titled Super 30, with Hrithik Roshan as Anand Kumar, based on his life and works. The movie was successful at the box office and became a great inspiration for many students.

Smear campaigns
On 23 July 2018, an article in Dainik Jagran cited former Super 30 students who said that only three students from the program had passed the IIT JEE exam that year, contrary to Kumar's claim that 26 had passed. The report also claimed that students who sought to enroll in Super 30 were pushed to enroll in another coaching center called Ramanujan Classes, a for-profit institution, on the pretext that Kumar would coach them if they performed well. Furthermore, the article alleged that by asking IIT aspirants to enroll in Ramanujan Classes, Kumar made over Rs 1 crore annually.

Deputy Chief Minister of Bihar Tejashwi Yadav spoke in favour of Anand Kumar and said that "propaganda is being run in media influenced by feudal mindset to discredit and defame Anand Kumar." Union Cabinet Minister and former actor, Shatrughan Sinha, has also spoken in Kumar's favour on Twitter. In August 2018, The Hindu reported that Kumar and his school are frequently the target of smear campaigns, and identified the potential sources of the fabricated stories that appeared in the Dainik Jagran newspaper in July.
Dainik Jagran made amends and presented its ‘Editor’s Choice Award’ to Super 30 founder Anand Kumar in 2021 recognising his work in the field of education.

References

External links

 

Writers from Patna
Scholars from Bihar
1973 births
Living people
21st-century Indian mathematicians
Indian columnists
Scientists from Patna
Journalists from Bihar
21st-century Indian educational theorists
Indian technology writers
Indian Hindus
Recipients of the Padma Shri in literature & education